Atta Yaqub (born 1979) is a Scottish model and actor of Pakistani/Punjabi descent. He played the lead role in the 2004 film Ae Fond Kiss....

Career
Yaqub began modelling as a teenager. He appeared in ads for The Royal Bank of Scotland and Cruise. He made his acting debut in Ken Loach's film Ae Fond Kiss where he played a Muslim man who falls in love with an Irish Catholic woman. For his role he was nominated for a British Independent Film Award for Best Newcomer.

He featured in Running in Traffic and Nina's Heavenly Delights. In 2011 he entered international cinema with the German film Fernes Land (Junction Point) and Sabiha Sumar's Rafina. In 2012 he joined the cast of the BBC Three drama Lip Service.

Personal life
Yaqub has a degree in IT management and also works as a counselor, advising drug addicts. He is a representative for the Goethe-Institut. He goes to schools around Scotland to promote the Show Racism The Red Card programme. He was also involved in the "One Scotland, Many Cultures" anti-racism campaign. Yaqub speaks English and Punjabi fluently as well as some Urdu and German. Yaqub was educated at Shawlands Academy, Glasgow.

In 2009, Yaqub criticised Prince Harry for making what he saw as prejudiced comments about South Asians and asked for a personal apology.

Filmography

References

External links 

Atta Yaqub's Modelling Page

1979 births
Living people
Scottish people of Pakistani descent
Scottish people of Punjabi descent
Scottish actors of South Asian descent
Scottish male models
British anti-racism activists
Male actors from Glasgow
Alumni of the University of Strathclyde
Scottish male film actors
Scottish male television actors
British film actors of Pakistani descent
British models of Pakistani descent
British male actors of South Asian descent